Eugene Arnold Obregon (November 12, 1930 – September 26, 1950) was a United States Marine who was posthumously awarded the United States' highest military decoration for valor — the Medal of Honor — for sacrificing his life to save that of a wounded comrade during the Second Battle of Seoul. On September 26, 1950, Private First Class Obregon was fatally wounded by enemy machine gun fire while using his body to shield a wounded fellow Marine.

Early years
Eugene Arnold Obregon, who was of Mexican American descent, was born on November 12, 1930, in Los Angeles, California. He attended elementary school and Theodore Roosevelt High School in Los Angeles before enlisting in the United States Marine Corps on June 7, 1948, at the age of 17.

Following recruit training at Marine Corps Recruit Depot San Diego, California, he was assigned to the Marine Corps Supply Depot in Barstow, California, where he served as a fireman until the outbreak of the Korean War. He was transferred to the 1st Marine Provisional Brigade and served as a machine gun ammunition carrier. His unit departed the United States on July 14, 1950, and arrived at Pusan, Korea on August 3, 1950.

He was in action by August 8, 1950, along the Naktong River, and participated in the Inchon landing. Then, on September 26, 1950, during the assault on the city of Seoul he was killed in action while using his body to shield a wounded fellow Marine. For this action, he was posthumously awarded the Medal of Honor.

The Medal of Honor was presented to PFC Obregon's parents by Secretary of the Navy Daniel A. Kimball on August 30, 1951.

The wounded comrade was PFC Bert M. Johnson, 19, of Grand Prairie, Texas. He was hospitalized, recovered, and returned to duty in the United States at Camp Lejeune, North Carolina.

Medal of Honor
Medal of Honor citation:

Decorations

In addition to the Medal of Honor, PFC Obregon also was posthumously awarded the Purple Heart, Presidential Unit Citation, Korean Service Medal with three bronze stars and the United Nations Service Medal.

Foundation

The Eugene A. Obregon Congressional Medal of Honor Foundation is building a Medal of Honor Monument complex located in the heart of Los Angeles's historic birthplace known as "El Pueblo". Work began in 2009 on a 36' long, curved granite wall that bears the inscribe names of all of the nearly 3,500 Medal Of Honor recipients awarded throughout American history. The organization also plans to erect a bronze sculpture of Obregon in recognition of Latino recipients and his sacrifice for his fellow Marines.

Namesakes and honors
A US Navy ship, a school, a Marine Corps barracks, an American Legion post, and three parks have been named in honor of Medal of Honor recipient Eugene Obregon.
The Maritime Prepositioning ship USNS PFC Eugene A. Obregon (T-AK-3006) entered into service in January 1985.
In 1966, the new Eugene A. Obregon Elementary School in Pico Rivera, California, was named for Eugene A. Obregon.
Obregon Park, just outside the main gate of the Marine Corps Logistics Base Barstow Yermo Annex, in Barstow, California, is named in honor of Obregon.
The East Los Angeles Interchange was named the Eugene A. Obregon Memorial Interchange, to honor Eugene A. Obregon.
A monument in Pershing Square, in Downtown Los Angeles is dedicated in honor of Obregon.
Obregon Road, on Marine Corps Air Station Miramar has been named for Obregon.
On Flag Day 2001, Eugene Obregon Park in  Pico Rivera, California was dedicated in his memory, in June.
The Eugene A. Obregon Park , in East Los Angeles, is the first Los Angeles County reclaimed water and sustainable landscaping designed regional park, and it honors Eugene A. Obregon.

See also

List of Korean War Medal of Honor recipients
List of Hispanic Medal of Honor recipients
Hispanics in the United States Marine Corps

References
Inline

General

1930 births
1950 deaths
United States Marine Corps Medal of Honor recipients
People from Los Angeles
United States Marines
American military personnel killed in the Korean War
Korean War recipients of the Medal of Honor
United States Marine Corps personnel of the Korean War